Adriana Calcanhotto (born October 3, 1965) is a Brazilian singer-songwriter. Her melancholic songs are often categorized in the MPB genre. She began her professional career in 1984 and released her first studio album in 1990.

Career
Born from musician Carlos Calcanhotto (originally Calcagnotto) of Italian origin from Volpago del Montello, Veneto, and from a Brazilian dancer.
Adriana's first album, called Enguiço, was released in 1990 and consisted mostly of covers of well known MPB (Brazilian pop) songs, part of the repertoire she used to perform as a singer in restaurants and bars in Porto Alegre. It included only one original composition, the title track. It spawned her first hit, a cover of Caetano Veloso's Naquela Estação, which became successful thanks to it being included in the soundtrack of the primetime soap Rainha da Sucata, one of the most watched in the history of Brazilian television.

1992 saw the release of Senhas, which included the hits "Mentiras" and "Esquadros" and was followed by a successful national tour. In 1994, Adriana, sporting a new look (short black hair as opposed to the slightly longer bright blond haircut she'd had since the beginning of her career) released A Fábrica do Poema, considered by many to be her most poetic album. She collaborated with lyricists like Waly Salomão and António Cícero (brother and constant musical partner of fellow singer Marina Lima) and included the hits "Metade" and "Inverno". This was followed by Maritmo (a combination of the words marítimo (maritime) and ritmo (rhythm)), a concept album intended as the first part of a trilogy having water as a main theme.

At the turn of the millennium, Adriana experienced the peak of her career with the release of the album Público in 2000. Her first live album/DVD, Público was recorded in a voz-e-violão (voice and guitar) style, meaning there was no band, only the singer playing her acoustic guitar, an instrument which has followed her through her entire career. The album included a cover of the staple torch song Devolva-me, made famous by the duo Leno & Lilian back in the 1960s. This album was followed by her first greatest hits compilation, Perfil (the success of this album prompted her record company to make it a series, releasing compilations of the same title by such artists as Cássia Eller, Zélia Duncan and Djavan). Another album of new material wouldn't be released until 2002, when the singer released "Cantada". In the meantime, Adriana toured Europe and Japan (as she has done many times since).

After the release of that album, Adriana took on the persona of Adriana Partimpim, an alias the singer claims to have used as a child. Adriana Partimpim released her self-titled "debut" in 2004, an album of covers featuring essentially traditional children's songs, but which also included familiar pop songs made to resemble children's songs. Examples of such songs are the covers of Paula Toller's Oito Anos (a song Toller wrote for her own son, Gabriel) and Claudinho & Buchecha's Fico Assim Sem Você, which became a hit on adult radios. A live CD/DVD combo of the show was also released the following year.

Her most recent album, Maré, was released in early 2008 and features a guest appearance by the singer's personal friend, Marisa Monte as well as a cover of Marina Lima's song Três. She toured Brazil to promote the record, as well as once again touring Europe, Japan and the United States. Adriana has chronicled her adventures on tour in the book Saga Lusa (Portuguese Saga), in which she shares her memoirs of the Portuguese leg of her most recent tour. The book was released on October 28 in Rio de Janeiro.

On October 23, 2009, Adriana performed in front of an adoring crowd at the Canadian Museum of Civilization in Gatineau, Quebec, Canada in a free performance presented by the Embassy of Brazil.

Since 2015, Calcanhotto had joined  Universidade de Coimbra as a university ambassador, acting as visiting lecturer on song composition courses and as an artist-in-residence.

Discography

Albums

References

External links

 Adriana Calcanhotto's official website (in Portuguese)
 "Musica Popular Brasileira e mais"
 Something Has Changed In Brazil: An Interview with Adriana Calcanhotto

1965 births
Living people
Brazilian women composers
21st-century Brazilian women singers
21st-century Brazilian singers
20th-century Brazilian women singers
20th-century Brazilian singers
Brazilian people of Italian descent
Música Popular Brasileira singers
Latin Grammy Award winners
People from Porto Alegre
Brazilian LGBT singers
Latin music composers
Latin music songwriters
21st-century Brazilian LGBT people
Women in Latin music
LGBT people in Latin music